Wallpa Wasi (Quechua wallpa hen, wasi house, "hen house", also spelled Huallpahuasi) is a mountain in the Andes of Peru which reaches a height of approximately . It is located in the Huánuco Region, Huánuco Province, San Pedro de Chaulán District.

References

Mountains of Peru
Mountains of Huánuco Region